John Streicker is a Canadian artist and politician, who was elected to the Legislative Assembly of Yukon in the 2016 Yukon general election. He represents the electoral district of Mount Lorne-Southern Lakes as a member of the Yukon Liberal Party.

Streicker is a professional engineer, and lectures at Yukon University. He holds a Bachelor of Science degree from the University of Saskatchewan and a master's degree in engineering from the University of New Brunswick. He lives in Marsh Lake, Yukon.

Political career

Prior to his election to the Yukon legislature, Streicker served on Whitehorse City Council from 2012 to 2015. He was formerly president of the Green Party of Canada, for whom he was a candidate in the federal electoral district of Yukon in the 2008 federal election and the 2011 election.

He was elected to the Yukon Legislative Assembly as the Liberal candidate for the rural riding of Mount Lorne-Southern Lakes on November 7, 2016, as part of a majority government of Sandy Silver. It was the first time the Liberals had won that riding. He defeated incumbent New Democrat Kevin Barr, who had also run in the 2011 federal election, by just 14 votes.

On December 3, 2016, Streicker was sworn into Yukon's Cabinet as Minister of Community Services, Minister responsible for the French Language Services Directorate, Minister responsible for the Yukon Liquor Corporation, and Minister responsible for the Yukon Lottery Corporation.

Electoral record

Yukon general election, 2016

|-

| Liberal
| John Streicker
| align="right"| 451
| align="right"| 38.5%
| align="right"| +27.9%
|-

| NDP
| Kevin Barr
| align="right"| 437
| align="right"| 37.3%
| align="right"| -9.5%

|-
! align left colspan=3|Total
! align=right| 1172
! align=right| 100.0%
! align=right| –
|}

Whitehorse municipal election, 2012

Canadian federal election, 2011

Canadian federal election, 2008

|align="left" colspan=2|Liberal hold
|align="right"|Swing
|align="right"| -6.19
|align="right"|

References

1962 births
Living people
Whitehorse city councillors
University of Saskatchewan alumni
University of New Brunswick alumni
Presidents of the Green Party of Canada
Green Party of Canada candidates in the 2008 Canadian federal election
Green Party of Canada candidates in the 2011 Canadian federal election
Yukon Liberal Party MLAs
Members of the Executive Council of Yukon